Gençlik Gücü Spor Kulübü is a Turkish Cypriot football club based in Nicosia. It was established in 1952.

Colors
The club colours are green and white.

Honors
Kıbrıs Kupası and Federasyon Kupası: (1)
 1981
Cumhurbaşkanlığı Kupası: (1)
 1981

References
 

Football clubs in Northern Cyprus
Football clubs in Nicosia
Association football clubs established in 1952
1952 establishments in Cyprus